KFMG-LP (98.9 FM) is a radio station licensed to Des Moines, Iowa. The station is owned by the Des Moines Community Radio Foundation. The noncommercial low-power station currently airs a primarily wide-ranging adult album alternative format with a strong local community focus.

The KFMG call sign has been used on two other stations. From 1964 to 1975, the KFMG call sign was allocated to 94.9 FM, and the station at one time aired a free-form rock format programmed by Ron Sorenson. Sorenson later owned the 103.3 FM frequency, which had the KFMG call sign and a similar format from 1992 until 1996, when Sorenson sold it to Saga Communications and the format was flipped to active rock. Sorenson is general manager of KFMG-LP.

KFMG-LP signed on the air on February 26, 2007. The station went off the air on January 15, 2010, with the board of previous licensee Employee & Family Resources (Hoyt Sherman Place Foundation) citing financial reasons. In March, the group donated the station to the Des Moines Community Radio Foundation, which consists partly of station staffers. The group returned the station to the air on June 14.

References

External links
 Official website
 

FMG-LP
FMG-LP